Herbert Meneses (July 17, 1939 – March 6, 2021) was a Guatemalan actor, writer, teacher, and director of film, television, and theater productions. He began his acting career at age 11. He was part of many radio play series.The government of Guatemala produced a homage to Meneses in 2015.

Filmography
Sólo de noche vienes (1967)
The Silence of Neto (1994)

References

1939 births
2021 deaths
People from Guatemala City
Guatemalan male stage actors
Guatemalan male television actors
Guatemalan male film actors
Guatemalan film directors
20th-century Guatemalan male actors